The Inter Dominion Hall of Fame is an organization created to recognise and honour those whose achievements have enriched the world of the Harness racing industry, particularly in the Inter Dominion series. The hall of fame was created to honor the standardbred annual races of the Inter Dominion which includes the Inter Dominion Pacing Championship and the Inter Dominion Trotting Championship. The races are held in a rotating cycle in Australia and New Zealand. The 2020 race is being held in New South Wales.

The championship is one of the most prominent harness racing series in Australasia. Both the Inter Dominion Harness Racing Council and the Inter Dominion Events Committee participate in organizing the races. Many high calibre standardbred horses have competed in the races. The hall of fame was founded in 2005 to honor the horses, drivers, and other important participants.

Selection criteria
The IDHOF inducts members based on the following criteria:

 Champion Horses :Those with at least two wins in an Inter Dominion series Grand Final.
 Top Drivers: Those with at least three wins in an Inter Dominion series Grand Final.
 Significant People:	Those awarded the Inter Dominion Ern Manea Gold Medal (formerly the Inter Dominion Gold Medal) which is issued for significant long-term contribution.

Recipients

Champion Horses
 Beautide
 Blacks A Fake
 Captain Sandy
 Gammalite
 Hondo Grattan
 I Can Doosit
 Im Themightyquinn
 Our Sir Vancelot
 Pride of Petite
 Scotch Notch
 Sundons Gift
 Take A Moment
Source:

Top Drivers
 Anthony Butt
 Gary Hall Jr.
 Brian Hancock
 Tony Herlihy
 Gavin Lang
 John Langdon
 Mark Purdon
 Natalie Rasmussen
 Doody Townley
Source:

Significant People
 Tony Abell
 Graeme Cochran
 Ken Dyer
 Brian Hancock
 Ern Manea
 Jack Phillips
 Dewar Robertshaw
 Bruce Skeggs
Source:

See also
 Harness racing in Australia
 Harness racing in New Zealand
 Inter Dominion

References

Hall of Fame
Horse racing museums and halls of fame
Halls of fame in New Zealand
Halls of fame in Australia
Harness racing in Australia
Harness racing in New Zealand